The Christchurch Southern Motorway is the main southern route into and out of Christchurch, New Zealand.

The motorway, which heads in a generally south-west direction, is approximately 20 km in length. It links the inner-city suburb of Addington, where it starts at the western end of Brougham Street, to just north-east of the satellite centre of Rolleston in the Selwyn District.

Route

The Christchurch Southern Motorway begins in the suburb of Addington at the western end of Brougham Street (at the Collins Street intersection), which is a busy multi-lane road linking to the port at Lyttelton, just south of the Christchurch Central Business District (CBD) on SH 76.

The motorway continues south-west, crossing Barrington Street (where there is an interchange) and Lincoln Road and passing to the south of Middleton. There is an interchange at Curletts Road, then skirts to the south of Wigram, passing under Aidanfield Drive and Awatea Road.

After the Halswell Junction Road interchange it runs to the south of Hornby and Isllington, and north of Prebbleton, to an interchange at Shands Road. From there, it continues south-west and joins Main South Road/SH 1 south of Templeton, and continues to an interchange at Weedons Road, ending just north of Rolleston. SH 1 continues south towards Ashburton as a regular two-lane highway.

History
Plans for a motorway network in Christchurch were first revealed in 1962, with the release of the Christchurch Master Transportation Plan. The Christchurch Southern Motorway, which formed a critical component of this plan, was proposed to run from Templeton to an interchange with the Christchurch Northern Motorway at Waltham, just south of the CBD. The first section of the motorway, a short two-lane arterial, opened in 1981, linking Brougham Street with Curletts Road. Further motorway work was subsequently deferred due to a lack of funding.

In 2012 a project was completed duplicating the existing motorway section, including a new flyover to link the motorway directly to Brougham Street. At the same time, the motorway was extended from Curletts Road, where a new full interchange was built, to a new terminating roundabout at Halswell Junction Road, a total length of approximately 7.5 km from Brougham Street. A cycleway was built along the length of the motorway on both sides. North of Springs Road, Halswell Junction Road was upgraded to form a two-lane undivided link from the motorway to SH 1 at Templeton.

In 2020, the motorway was extended approximately 12.5 km to the south-west as far as Rolleston. A 7.5 km extension of the motorway was constructed to Robinsons Road south of Templeton where it joined SH 1, which was upgraded as far as Rolleston. The new extension includes a half interchange at Halswell Junction Road to replace the roundabout, a full diamond interchange at Shands Road, and a grade separated 'Y-junction' interchange south-west of Isllington where the extension joins the existing SH 1.

The existing SH 1 along Main South Road was duplicated and upgraded to motorway standard as far as Weedons Road, where a folded diamond interchange was built. This included removing direct access to the highway from private property through provision of two new local access roads.

Future Projects
Two projects have been funded adjacent to each end of the motorway as part of the New Zealand Upgrade Programme. At the northern end, $40 million will be spent on SH 76 (Brougham Street) to prioritise north-south public transport routes, create safer, dedicated walking and cycling access, and ensuring better east-west traffic flow and capacity. At the southern end, $60 million will be spent on a new two-lane overbridge to cross SH 1 from Rolleston Drive to Hoskyns Road, and to upgrade four intersections along SH 1 between Burnham and Rolleston to better manage the forecast future growth in traffic volumes along this section of the highway. These projects are scheduled to begin in 2022 for completion in 2025/26. Details of the interventions are not yet available.

Exit list

{| class="wikitable"
|-
! Territorial authority
! Location
! km
! Destination
! Notes
|-
| rowspan=4| Christchurch City
| rowspan=2 | Addington
| rowspan=2 | 8
|  – City Centre, Lyttelton
| Christchurch Southern Motorway begins
|-
| Barrington Street – Addington, Barrington, Cashmere
|
|-
| Middleton
| 11
|  – Upper Riccarton, Airport, West Coast   – Halswell, Akaroa
|
|- 
| Hornby South
| 15
| Halswell Junction Road
| Eastbound entrance and westbound exit
|-
| rowspan=5| Selwyn District
| Prebbleton
|
| Shands Road – Hornby, Airport
| 
|-
| rowspan=2| Templeton
| 
|  – Templeton, Picton
| Westbound entrance and eastbound exit
|-
|
| Berketts Road
| Southbound exit and entrance
|-
| rowspan=2| Rolleston
|
| Weedons Road – Rolleston, West Melton, Lincoln
|
|-
|
|  – Timaru
| Christchurch Southern Motorway ends

References

External links
Christchurch Southern Corridor (NZ Transport Agency)

Proposed roads in New Zealand
Motorways in New Zealand
Transport in Christchurch